The 1901–02 Cornell Big Red men's basketball team represented Cornell University during the 1901–02 college men's basketball season. The team captain William Steele.

Schedule

|-

References

Cornell Big Red men's basketball seasons
Cornell
Cornell Big Red
Cornell Big Red